"You Still Believe in Me" is a song by American rock band the Beach Boys from their 1966 album Pet Sounds. Initially conceived as "In My Childhood", it was the first songwriting collaboration between Brian Wilson, the group's de facto leader, and songwriter Tony Asher. Wilson sang the lead vocal.

The lyrics are about a man who, while acknowledging his irresponsible behavior and unfaithfulness, is impressed by the unwavering loyalty of his lover, who is left shouldering the stability of their relationship. Wilson's then-wife Marilyn surmised that this choice of subject matter was indebted to the couple's marital struggles at the time.

One of the first songs produced for Pet Sounds, Wilson recorded the track between October 1965 and February 1966 with the aid of his bandmates, Asher, and 13 session musicians who variously played harpsichord, clarinets, 12-string electric guitars, timpani, finger cymbals, pianos, basses, and bicycle horn. Wilson and Asher created the song's ethereal intro by plucking a piano's strings with a bobby pin.

Background

"You Still Believe in Me" was originally conceived by Wilson as a song titled "In My Childhood". According to biographer Peter Ames Carlin, "Brian already had a set of lyrics that fit with the tune's sweet vaguely melancholy sound and quirky textural effects (a bicycle horn and bell). But he didn't like his lyrics anymore and wanted to adapt the tune to another concept." In December 1965, Wilson contacted jingle writer Tony Asher about a possible lyric collaboration, wanting to do something "completely different" with someone he had never written with before. Asher accepted the offer, and within ten days, they were writing together. Wilson played some of the music he had recently recorded and gave a cassette to Asher containing the backing track to "In My Childhood".

There are discrepancies from Asher as to whether "In My Childhood" had a recorded vocal or a different melody at this juncture. Quoted in the 1978 biography The Beach Boys and the California Myth, Asher said, "We wiped off those vocals and that melody and rewrote it.... The [chord] changes were the only thing that stayed the same." However, in a 1996 interview, Asher said, "Brian never let me hear the lyric to it. I didn't hear the vocals, but I could hear a little bit of some backgrounds and stuff that were leaking through other [microphones] but I didn't really hear any melody to it." Later, Asher revised his story again, "If I remember correctly, the original melody sounded exactly the way it does on the album, and someone had already written lyrics."

The result of Asher's tryout was "You Still Believe in Me", and the success of the piece convinced Wilson that Asher was the wordsmith he had been looking for. In a 1996 interview, Wilson summarized "You Still Believe in Me" as a "little 'Boys Choir'-type song with me doing the soprano. Very, very spiritual."

Lyrics

Biographer Mark Dillon described the lyrics of "You Still Believe in Me" as "a musing about the ups and downs of adult romance". In the song, the narrator expresses appreciation for his lover's unwavering loyalty while confessing to his irresponsible behavior and unfaithfulness. He admits that he is "not where I should be", and though he puts forth effort in the relationship, he has occasionally "fail[ed] myself". The relationship's stability is thus shouldered by the more mature partner.

As with other songs on Pet Sounds, the subject matter of "You Still Believe in Me" derived from Asher and Wilson's intimate discussions regarding their experiences in life and romance.  Wilson stated that the song is about a man who feels free to express love in a fashion associated with the opposite sex. He explained to an interviewer, You Still Believe In Me' was more of what I would call a man who would not be afraid to take all of his clothes off and sing like a girl because he had feelings for people from that perspective. I was able to close my eyes and go into a world and sing a little more effeminately and more sweet—which allows a lot more love to come down through me, you know what I mean?"

Brian's then-wife Marilyn felt that Brian had based the song on their marriage. Biographer Timothy White similarly attributed an autobiographical element to the song as viewed through Brian's perspective. He writes,

"You Still Believe in Me" marks the first song on Pet Sounds that contains such introspective themes which pervade the rest of the album. Commenting on its placement on the record, music critic Jim Esch said the song develops "a theme inaugurated and suggested by 'Wouldn't It Be Nice': fragile lovers buckling under the pressure of external forces they can't control, self-imposed romantic expectations and personal limitations, while simultaneously trying to maintain faith in one other."

Composition

"You Still Believe in Me" is the only composition on Pet Sounds set in the key of B major, and the first of only five tracks on the album that does not modulate or waver into other keys. The song features frequent use of the ii–V–I turnaround (six uninterrupted repeats of I–ii7–V7). According to musicologist Philip Lambert, the repetition in the verse progression appears to reflect "the constancy of the girl's faith and spirit", whereas the simplistic melodies and overall mood of the piece "captures the guy's immaturity". After the first two sections, the progression rests on a G chord (VI), occurring on the line "love to me", and is followed shortly by the hook in the chorus. Biographer David Leaf quoted an unnamed "classically-trained musician" discussing the song:

The changes in the verses are contrasted with the more complex progression heard in the chorus ("You [vi7/2̂] still be- [ii7/1̂] -lieve [vi7/5̂] in [VI] me"). At this point in the piece, Wilson's solo lead vocal is joined by full group vocals. Lambert characterizes the abrupt shift in harmonic complexity as evocative of a music box being motorized' by a few turns of a crank on the back of the box", while the introduction of "more sophisticated, jazzified chord changes" further solidifies the contrast between the verses. The resolution to VI (G major), down a major third from the root, is similar to the other songs on the album which do change key, albeit from down a minor third. 

Musicologist James Perone writes that the "snaky" melody in "I want to cry" represents one of the "high points" of the piece. He notes a contrast from the melody heard in prior sections, as the third phrase begins a step higher than the first two melodic phrases, which are identical. In his belief, "This corresponds to the singer's descriptions of all the ways in which his lover continues to forgive him." Perone adds that "the use of a stepwise falloff of the interval of a third at the end of each verse" is a common device in Wilson's songs, one that often figures "in his introspective songs of alienation (e.g., 'In My Room')."

Like "Wouldn't It Be Nice", there are tempo changes throughout the song. The ending, recorded before Asher rewrote the lyrics, features the sounds of a bicycle bell and horn, a remnant of the song's original childhood theme. Granata writes, "the imaginative use of bicycle bell, bicycle horn, and finger cymbals [helped] evoke a juvenile air that [would mirror] the immature attitude projected by [Asher's] lyric."

Recording

Wilson produced the first session for the instrumental track, logged as "Untitled", on October 14, 1965 at Western Studio. On January 24, 1966, the introduction to the song, now titled "You Still Believe in Me", was recorded at Western. Wilson and Asher created the backing track of this section by plucking a piano's strings with a bobby pin. Asher explained: 

Group vocals were overdubbed on or before February 16 at Western. Lead vocals were partially redone at a later date; the double-tracking for Wilson's lead was recorded live-to-tape during the mono mixdown. This meant that when Pet Sounds was first remixed for stereo in 1996, this double-tracked vocal could not be isolated. Instead, only the single-tracked vocal was used on the stereo remix included with The Pet Sounds Sessions (1997).

Critical reception 
On May 16, 1966, "You Still Believe in Me" was released as the second track on Pet Sounds. In his self-described "unbiased" review of the album for Record Mirror, Norman Jopling described the song as "slightly off tune... [it has] a delicate backing which thank heavens doesn't interfere with the complicated but smoothflowing  harmonies..." AllMusic reviewer Jim Esch decreed that the song "signalled to listeners of Pet Sounds that something new and wonderful was happening to pop music" and referred to the ending coda as the "moment that you realize that something in pop music has irrevocably crossed the line and merged with a classical sensibility."

Influence
The Beatles' Paul McCartney regarded the track as one of his favorites on Pet Sounds. In a 1990 interview, McCartney stated of "You Still Believe in Me":

Robert Schneider, frontman of the Apples in Stereo, similarly praised "You Still Believe in Me" as his favorite song on the album. Schneider said, "It's just so beautiful... when I think about all the qualities I like about Pet Sounds, really it's this song I bring to mind".

Live performances
The Beach Boys performed "You Still Believe in Me" at their live concerts during the early 1970s. One of these performances was included on the band's 1973 album The Beach Boys in Concert.

In 2001, the song was performed by Wilson Phillips – a singing trio which included Wilson's two daughters Carnie and Wendy – at a Brian Wilson tribute concert held at the Radio City Music Hall in New York. Wilson, who attended the show, later remarked of this performance, "it blew my fucking mind".

Personnel
Per band archivist Craig Slowinski.

The Beach Boys
Al Jardine – backing vocals
Bruce Johnston – backing vocals
Mike Love – bass vocals, backing vocals
Brian Wilson – lead vocal; plucked piano strings
Carl Wilson – backing vocals
Dennis Wilson – backing vocals

Guest
Tony Asher – plucked piano strings
Marilyn Wilson – additional vocals in intro (uncertain credit)

Session musicians

Hal Blaine – bicycle horn, finger cymbals
Chuck Britz – engineer
Glen Campbell – double-tracked 12-string electric lead guitars
Al de Lory – harpsichord
Steve Douglas – acoustic grand piano
Bill Green – contra-clarinet
Jim Horn – clarinet
Plas Johnson – clarinet
Carol Kaye – electric bass
Barney Kessel – double-tracked 12-string electric mando-guitars
Jay Migliori – bass clarinet
Lyle Ritz – upright bass
Julius Wechter – bicycle bell, timpani

Technical staff
 Chuck Britz – engineer (instrumental)
 unknown – additional engineers (possibly Ralph Valentin, Jerry Hochman, H. Bowen David, Jim Lockert or Phil Kaye)

Cover versions 

 1981 – Kirsty MacColl, single
 2001 – Elvis Costello and Anne Sofie von Otter, For the Stars
 2005 – M. Ward, Transistor Radio

Notes

References

Bibliography

External links
 
 
 
 A Google Designer Visualizes The Beach Boys' Pop Ecstasy

1966 songs
The Beach Boys songs
Psychedelic pop songs
Songs written by Brian Wilson
Songs written by Tony Asher
Song recordings produced by Brian Wilson
Chamber pop songs